Dexter Langen (born 6 December 1980 in Friedberg, Hesse) is a German former football defender. As of December 2014, he is training to be a nursery teacher.

Career 
On 15 December 2008, he was released with teammate Đorđije Ćetković from Hansa Rostock and was demoted to reserve team, on 9 March 2009 he was reprieved and trained with the first team.

References

External links
 Dexter Langen at kicker.de 
 

1980 births
Living people
People from Friedberg, Hesse
Sportspeople from Darmstadt (region)
German footballers
Kickers Offenbach players
Dynamo Dresden players
FC Hansa Rostock players
Borussia Mönchengladbach players
Bundesliga players
2. Bundesliga players
3. Liga players
Association football defenders
Footballers from Hesse